Toxodontidae is an extinct family of notoungulate mammals, known from the Oligocene to the Holocene (11,000 BP) of South America, with one genus, Mixotoxodon, also known from the Pleistocene of Central America and southern North America (as far north as Texas). Member of the family were medium to large-sized, and had medium to high-crowned dentition, which in derived members of the group evolved into ever-growing cheek teeth. Isotopic analyses have led to the conclusion that Pleistocene members of the family were mixed feeders (both browsing and grazing).

Taxonomy 
The endemic notoungulate and litoptern ungulates of South America have been shown by studies of collagen and mitochondrial DNA sequences to be a sister group to the perissodactyls.

In 2014, a study identifying a new species of toxodontid resolved the families phylogenetic relations. The below cladogram was found by the study:

References

Further reading 
 McKenna, Malcolm C., and Bell, Susan K. 1997. Classification of Mammals Above the Species Level. Columbia University Press, New York, 631 pp.

External links 
 

Toxodonts
Oligocene mammals
Miocene mammals of South America
Chattian first appearances
Holocene extinctions
Fossil taxa described in 1845
Taxa named by Richard Owen
Pliocene notoungulates
Prehistoric mammal families